Tranylcypromine/trifluoperazine (brand names Parstelin, Parmodalin, Jatrosom N, Stelapar) is a combination formulation of the monoamine oxidase inhibitor antidepressant drug tranylcypromine and the typical antipsychotic drug trifluoperazine that has been used in the treatment of major depressive disorder. It contains 10 mg tranylcypromine and 1 mg trifluoperazine. The drug has been in clinical use since at least 1961.

See also
 Amitriptyline/perphenazine
 Flupentixol/melitracen
 Olanzapine/fluoxetine

References

Antidepressants
Antipsychotics
Combination drugs